Lindeman Lake, also known as Lake Lindeman, is a lake on the Chilkoot Trail in far northwestern British Columbia, Canada. It is just south of Bennett Lake and northeast of the summit of the Chilkoot Pass. From the direction of the pass it is fed by Lindeman Creek (formerly known as One Mile River), which connects the two lakes.  Lake Lindeman and Lake Bennett were key components of the Chilkoot Trail during the Klondike Gold Rush, with both seeing hundreds of vessels built to transit their waters and camp-town "tent cities" established on their shores. Lindeman was located at the south end of Lindeman Lake, while Bennett, often known as Bennett City, was at the south end of Lake Bennett.

References

External link
 

Klondike Gold Rush
Lakes of British Columbia
Yukon River
Cassiar Land District